The 1880 United States presidential election in Connecticut took place on November 2, 1880, as part of the 1880 United States presidential election. Voters chose six representatives, or electors to the Electoral College, who voted for president and vice president.

Connecticut voted for the Republican nominee, James A. Garfield, over the Democratic nominee, Winfield Scott Hancock. Garfield won the state by a narrow margin of 2.01%. This would be the last time that a Republican would carry the state until William McKinley won it in 1896.

Results

See also
 United States presidential elections in Connecticut

References

Connecticut
1880
1880 Connecticut elections